Sphaerulina is a genus of fungi in the family Mycosphaerellaceae.

References

External links
 

 
Mycosphaerellaceae genera